The 1993 Midland Bank World Indoor Bowls Championship  was held at Preston Guild Hall, Preston, England, from 15–27 February 1993.
Richard Corsie won his third title beating Jim McCann in the final.

The Pairs title went to Gary Smith & Andy Thomson.

The Women's World Indoor Championship was held in Guernsey during April with the final being held on 18 April. the winner was Kate Adams.

Winners

Draw and results

Men's singles

Men's Pairs

Women's singles

Group stages

Knockout

References

External links
Official website

World Indoor Bowls Championship